Artsy,  formally known as Art.sy Inc is a New York City based online art brokerage. Its main business is developing and hosting website for numerous galleries as well as selling art for them. It utilizes a search engine and database to draw connections and map relationships among works of art.

The brokerage was founded by Carter Cleveland, a Princeton University computer science graduate. It is currently led by Mike Steib, a former CEO of XO Group, the parent company of The Knot.

Artsy has received financial backing from multiple investors.

History

Carter Cleveland, the son of an art historian, founded Artsy during his senior year at Princeton University and worked on the site from his dorm room. Cleveland's goal was for the site to serve as a place where users could discover art online.  In May 2010, Artsy participated in the New York City conference, TechCrunch Disrupt, where they competed in the Startup Battlefield and received the Yahoo! Rookie Award!  A year later, the team demoed Artsy at the Beyeler Foundation at Art Basel (June 15, 2011).

In 2019, it was reported that in 2018 the data for 1,070,000 accounts were stolen from Artsy. The information included the name, email address, location, IP address and password SHA-512 hashed with a salt.  The passwords were not stored in cleartext, but an email from Artsy encouraged users to change their passwords.

Corporate affairs

Financials
Since launching, Artsy has raised a total of $100 million from individuals in the worlds of art, tech, and media, including Larry Gagosian, Wendi Murdoch, and Rich Barton.

Products (website and app)
Artsy currently features over 1,000,000 works by 100,000 artists on its site through partnered galleries.

As of March 2018, Artsy averaged 2.3 million unique visitors each month.

The Art Genome Project

Artsy is powered by The Art Genome Project — "an ongoing study of the characteristics that distinguish and connect works of art."  A collaboration between art historians and engineers, The Art Genome Project draws upon art-historical scholarship and artificial intelligence to assign values to artwork based on over 1211 characteristics or "genes."  These categories range from color and period to "Technique: Documentary Photography" and "Group Portrait."  The Art Genome Project aims to help users uncover works of art based on personal taste and preference to facilitate  discovery of art. As of 2020 the AGP was on hold for restructuring.

Reception
According to Wired, Artsy "has the potential to introduce each buyer to a wide range of artists and artworks, all of them related in some way and—this is key—most of them unknown and otherwise inaccessible to any but the most knowledgeable connoisseurs."

Critics of Art.sy label The Art Genome Project forced and artificial and point to the difficulty of representing the full experience of art online.

Awards and recognition 
Artsy received the "Rookie Disruptor Award" in 2010.

See also 
 Artmo
 Artnet
 Maison contemporain

 Saatchi Art

References

External links

 
 Artsy Open Source on GitHub Pages
 The Art Genome Project

Online databases
Online marketplaces of the United States